Sekhar Chandra is an Indian music composer, Singer and director notable for his work in the Telugu cinema industry. His debut films as music director were Anasuya in Telugu and Ooh La La La in Tamil.

Personal life and career
He was born in Tamil Nadu, India. He is the son of Hari Anumolu, Director of photography, known for Telugu films including Ladies Tailor, Shri Kanakamalaxmi Recording Dance Troupe, Nuvve Kavali, and Gamyam.

Discography

As composer

References

External links
 

Living people
Telugu people
Film musicians from Andhra Pradesh
Telugu film score composers
Tamil film score composers
21st-century Indian composers
Year of birth missing (living people)